The Giro d'Italia is an annual road bicycle race held over 23 days in May and June. Established in 1909 by newspaper La Gazzetta dello Sport, the Giro is the second-most well-known and prestigious of cycling's three "Grand Tours"; the others are the Tour de France and the Vuelta a España. The race usually covers approximately 3,500 kilometres (2,200 mi), passing through Italy and neighboring countries such as France and Switzerland. The race is broken into day-long segments, called stages. Individual finishing times for each stage are totaled to determine the overall winner at the end of the race.

Host cities

References

Footnotes

Citations

See also
List of Giro d'Italia classification winners
Pink jersey statistics
List of Grand Tour general classification winners

History of cycling